Yu Xinyuan (Chinese: 于欣源; born February 13, 1985) is a Chinese tennis player. 

He competed for China at the 2008 Summer Olympics in the men's singles and in men's doubles with partner Zeng Shao-Xuan.

ATP Challenger and ITF Futures finals

Singles: 4 (3–1)

Doubles: 37 (23–14)

See also
Tennis in China

External links
 
 
 

1985 births
Living people
Chinese male tennis players
Olympic tennis players of China
Tennis players from Beijing
Tennis players at the 2008 Summer Olympics
Asian Games medalists in tennis
Tennis players at the 2006 Asian Games
Medalists at the 2006 Asian Games
Asian Games bronze medalists for China
21st-century Chinese people